Anti-Vaccination Society of America opposed compulsory smallpox vaccination from the final decades of the 19th century through the 1910s. It was founded in 1879 after a visit to the United States by William Tebb. It published a periodical called Vaccination.

Members
William Tebb (1830–1917) inspired the organization.
L.H. Piehn of Nora Springs, Iowa. He was a banker and his daughter died of sepsis after the smallpox vaccine in 1894.
Montague Leverson of New York City.
Weyprecht of New York City in 1895.
Frank D. Blue of Terre Haute, Indiana was secretary in 1899. 
Porter F. Cope (1869–1950) was the secretary.
E. C. Townsend of New York City was assistant secretary for the Eastern States. He was the publisher of Anti-Vaccination News.

See also

 Anti-Vaccination League of America
 National Anti-Vaccination League

References

1879 establishments in the United States
Anti-vaccination organizations
Anti-vaccination in the United States